Below is an episodic synopsis of Be Happy, which consists of 20 episodes and broadcast on MediaCorp Channel 8.

Episodic Synopsis

See also
List of programmes broadcast by MediaCorp Channel 8
Be Happy

Lists of Singaporean television series episodes